Events from the year 1982 in Taiwan, Republic of China. This year is numbered Minguo 71 according to the official Republic of China calendar.

Incumbents
 President – Chiang Ching-kuo
 Vice President – Hsieh Tung-min
 Premier – Sun Yun-suan
 Vice Premier – Chiu Chuang-huan

Events

June
 27 June – The opening of Taitung Station in Taitung City, Taitung County.

July
 1 July
 The upgrade of Chiayi City and Hsinchu City from county-administered cities of Chiayi County and Hsinchu County respectively to provincial cities.
 Xiangshan Township of Hsinchu County was incorporated to the newly formed Hsinchu City.

October
15 October – Aleksandr Solzhenitsyn visited Taiwan.

December
 30 December – The establishment of Youchang Forest Park in Nanzih District, Kaohsiung City.

Births
 1 January – Lin Chih-sheng, baseball player
 19 January – Angela Chang, singer and actress
 24 January – Liu Keng-shin, baseball player
 28 January – Lin Yueh-ping, baseball player
 6 February – Tank, singer
 26 February – Pan Li-chun, table tennis player
 5 March – Pan Wei-lun, professional baseball pitcher
 15 April – Chen Kuan-jen, baseball player
 18 April – Chang Hsin-yan, actress
 8 May – Lo Hsiao-ting, softball player
 11 June – Lin Chih-chieh, basketball player
 19 June – Joe Cheng, model, actor and singer
 13 July – Pan Wei-chih, football player
 7 August – Chang Ming-huang, discus thrower and shot putter
 18 August – Feng Pao-hsing, football player
 30 August
 Tony Yang, actor
 Wu Tsing-fong, songwriter
 5 September – Cyndi Wang, singer and actress
 11 September – Queenie Tai, actress
 17 October – Cheng Po-jen, baseball player
 23 October – Bianca Bai, actress and model
 29 October – Ariel Lin, singer and actress
 30 October – Abby Fung, actress
 8 November – Ethan Juan, actor and model
 16 December – Chiang Shih-lu, football player
 26 December – Lin Cheng-feng, baseball player

References

 
Years of the 20th century in Taiwan